Keagan Wilbur Buchanan (born 3 April 1991) is a South African soccer player who plays as a midfielder for South African Premier Division side AmaZulu.

References

1991 births
Living people
South African soccer players
Association football defenders
F.C. Cape Town players
Bloemfontein Celtic F.C. players
Kaizer Chiefs F.C. players
Maritzburg United F.C. players
AmaZulu F.C. players
South African Premier Division players
National First Division players